Orolik railway station is a railway station on Novska–Tovarnik railway in Croatia. The station is operated by Croatian Railways, the state-owned railway company. It is located at the southern edge of the village of Orolik.

On 19 January 2012 reconstruction of the Orolik railway station was completed. It was a part of reconstruction of nine railway stations on 67 kilometers route between Vinkovci and Tovarnik-Croatia–Serbia border funded from the Instrument for Pre-Accession Assistance of the European Union (48%) and Croatian Government (52%).

See also
Church of St. Peter and Paul, Orolik
Orient Express which used the line on which the station is located.
Tovarnik railway station
Vinkovci railway station
Zagreb–Belgrade railway

References 

Railway stations in Croatia